Schistura dubia is a species of ray-finned fish in Schistura, the largest genus of stone loaches, from Thailand.

References 

D
Fish described in 1990